is a Japanese long-distance runner. He competed in the marathon at the 1968, 1972 and the 1976 Summer Olympics.

His most important win in his marathoning career occurred at the prestigious 1970 Fukuoka Marathon, in which he ran a personal best 2:10:37.8 (also setting a Japanese record at the time). He beat runner-up Kenny Moore by nearly a minute.

References

1943 births
Living people
People from Tsubame, Niigata
Sportspeople from Niigata Prefecture
Japanese male long-distance runners
Japanese male marathon runners
Olympic male long-distance runners
Olympic male marathon runners
Olympic athletes of Japan
Athletes (track and field) at the 1968 Summer Olympics
Athletes (track and field) at the 1972 Summer Olympics
Athletes (track and field) at the 1976 Summer Olympics
Japan Championships in Athletics winners